Snow and Ashes is a 2010 Canadian drama film directed by Charles-Olivier Michaud. It follows the story of Blaise and David, two war correspondents covering an unnamed conflict in eastern Europe. It was awarded by the Jury Award for Best Narrative at the 2010 Slamdance Film Festival.

Cast
 Rhys Coiro as Blaise Dumas
 David-Alexandre Coiteux as David Arnault
 Lina Roessler as Sophie St-Laurent
 Marina Eva as Patricia Aznii
 Gabriel Oszeciuk as Mishka Aznii
 Frédéric Gilles as Manu Poitier
 Natalie Chepurnyi as Stef Abelev
 Marianne Farley as Sana Abelev
 Alex Kudrytsky as Lt. Kaparov
 Jean Lapointe as Thomas Dumas

Accolades
The film won the Jury Award for Best Narrative at the 2010 Slamdance Film Festival and won several other prizes, notably the prize for Best Foreign Language Film at the 2010 Mexico City International Film Festival and the Jury Award for Best Feature at the Sonoma Valley Film Festival.

External links
 
 
 

Canadian drama films
Films directed by Charles-Olivier Michaud
2010 drama films
2010s Canadian films